The Evansville Police Department (EPD) is the law enforcement agency for the city of Evansville, Indiana, United States. Its operational jurisdiction covers all areas within the city limits of Evansville, though its police officers have legal jurisdiction throughout the State of Indiana. The department currently has 286 sworn police officers and serves a population of approximately 120,000.

History
The Evansville Police Department was created in 1863 as a night watch to supplement the Evansville City Marshal's staff. The marshal's staff, which consisted of the elected marshal, a deputy marshal, and constables, still had primary law enforcement responsibility within the city. The department initially had three members: City Marshal Ed Martin (who served as acting Chief of Police) and two officers (who also served as firemen). The department grew quickly due to an increase in crime attributed to returning Civil War veterans. In 1865 the force was increased to 16 officers, which further increased to 23 officers in 1869. A city ordinance passed in 1866 expanded the duties of the department beyond that of a night security detail. A detective bureau was established in 1892. By the time Indiana enacted Prohibition in 1918 (two years before the 18th Amendment created nationwide Prohibition) the EPD had 97 officers, 5 civilian employees, 4 automobiles, 16 day-shift walking beats, and 34 night-shift walking beats. The Evansville Police Department has continued to evolve to meet the needs of Evansville's citizens with professional standards, community policing initiatives, and up-to-date equipment and tactics.

Organization
EPD consists of three divisions: Patrol, Criminal Investigation, and Administrative. In addition to these divisions, the department has a number of specialized assignments. Unlike larger departments which may have officers dedicated to these assignments full-time, in the EPD they are performed as-needed and in addition to an officer's normal duties.

Patrol
Patrol is the primary function of the Evansville Police Department. The patrol division includes the patrol officers designated to respond to 911 calls as well as:
 Alarm Coordinator
 Hit and Run Unit
 K9 Unit
 Traffic Enforcement Unit
 Crime Prevention Unit
 Crime-Free Multi-Housing Unit
The Evansville Police Department divides the city into three divisions, called "sectors". These sectors are then further divided into smaller geographical areas called "beats". Each beat is typically patrolled by 2 patrol cars which may be staffed with either 1 or 2 officers. The patrol division consists of 1 deputy chief, 1 captain, 4 lieutenants, 21 sergeants, 138 officers, and 5 civilian employees.

West Sector
The EPD West Sector is bounded by the Evansville city limits to the west and north, US 41 to the east, the Lloyd Expressway to the south (east of Pigeon Creek) and the Evansville city limits to the south (west of Pigeon Creek). The west sector consists of 4 beats. There are 4 crime prevention officers assigned to the west sector. The west sector is one of the most diverse sectors in the city, with mixes of residential, industrial, and commercial areas. The west sector has an office/station which is staffed part-time; the office is located at 401 E Columbia St.

East Sector
The EPD East Sector is bounded by US 41 to the west (north of the Lloyd Expressway), Weinbach Ave to the west (south of the Lloyd Expressway), and the Evansville city limits to the north, east, and south. The east sector consists of 5 beats. There are 3 crime prevention officers assigned to the east sector. The east sector is predominately residential to the south and west and includes a large and fast-growing commercial district to the north and east, especially along Green River Road, Burkhardt Road, Cross Pointe Blvd, and the Lloyd Expressway. The east sector does not have its own office/station.

South Sector
The EPD South Sector is bounded by the Ohio River and Pigeon Creek to the west, the Lloyd Expressway to the north, Weinbach Ave to the east, and the Evansville city limits to the south. There are 3 crime prevention officers assigned to the south sector. The south sector is almost entirely residential, with the exception of the downtown area which includes many governmental buildings, the Ford Center arena, Old National Events Plaza conference center, and other high-density structures. The south sector has an office/station which is staffed-part-time; the office is located at 315 Taylor Ave. EPD Headquarters is also located within the south sector at 15 NW Martin Luther King Jr Blvd.

Criminal Investigation
The criminal investigation division is responsible for the investigation of crimes and the collection of evidence. The CID has a number of sections and units, including:
 Adult Investigation Unit
 Domestic Violence Unit
 Internet Crimes Against Children Unit
 Juvenile Unit
 School Liaison Unit
 School Safety Unit
 Alcohol, Tobacco, and Firearms Task Force
 DEA Task Force
 FBI/Violent Crimes Task Force
 Drug Interdiction Unit
 Gang Unit
 Narcotics Joint Task Force Unit
 Vice/Intelligence Unit
 Sexual Violence Unit
 Auto Theft Unit
 Crime Scene Unit
 Financial Crimes Unit
The criminal investigation division consists of 1 deputy chief, 1 captain, 3 lieutenants, 12 sergeants, 67 officers, and 3 civilian employees.

Administrative
The administrative division performs the administrative and service functions of the EPD. The administrative division has a number of sections, including:
 Chief's Office
 Internal Affairs
 Records Unit
 Property/Evidence Custodial Unit
 Information Technology
 Professional Standards Unit
 Special Project Coordinator
 Public Information Officer
 Staff Inspections Unit
 Personnel Unit
 Training Unit
 Firearms Training Coordinator
 Field Training Unit
 Southwest Indiana Law Enforcement Academy
 Fleet Manager
 Office Services Unit

Specialized Assignments
The Evansville Police Department has a number of specialized assignments. These assignments are part-time and performed in addition to an officer's regular duties. For example, a member of the SWAT Team is typically a patrol officer who patrols the city and responds to 911 calls but will then perform SWAT Team duties when the need for the SWAT Team arises. The specialized assignments in the EPD are:
 Bicycle Patrol Unit
 Crisis Intervention Team
 Crisis Negotiation Team
 Family Support Team
 Hazardous Devices Unit
 Peer Support Team
 Polygraph Unit
 SWAT Team

Rank structure

References

Municipal police departments of Indiana
Evansville, Indiana
1863 establishments in Indiana